= Juana Muñoz-Liceras =

Canadian academic

Juana Muñoz-Liceras is Professor of Hispanic and General Linguistics in the Department of Modern Languages and Literatures at the University of Ottawa, Ottawa, Canada. Her main research focus on the acquisition of Spanish as a Second Language as well theoretical linguistics and language contact. She was recognized as one of the 10 most influential Hispanics of 2013 in Canada by a panel selected by the Canadian Hispanic Business Alliance.

== Publications ==
- Markedness, contrastive analysis and the acquisition of Spanish syntax by English speakers, 1983
- Linguistic theory and second language acquisition : the Spanish nonnative grammar of English speakers, 1986
- La adquisición de las lenguas segundas y la gramática universal,1996
- The role of formal features in second language acquisition, 2007
